Tamazatyube (Tamaza-Töbe) is a rural locality (a selo) and the administrative centre of Tamazatyubinsky Selsoviet, Babayurtovsky District, Republic of Dagestan, Russia. The population was 1,718 as of 2010. There are 19 streets. Selo was founded in 1939.

Geography
Tamazatyube is located 42 km northeast of Babayurt (the district's administrative centre) by road. Tamazatyube is the nearest rural locality.

References 

Rural localities in Babayurtovsky District